The Chicago mayoral election of 1977 was a special election held on June 7, 1977 to complete the remainder of the  unexpired mayoral term of Richard J. Daley who died of a heart attack in December 1976. The election saw the election of Chicago, Illinois' first interim mayor, Democrat and 11th ward alderman Michael A. Bilandic. Bliandic defeated Republican Dennis H. Block by a landslide 56% margin.

Background
After the death in office of Richard J. Daley on December 20, 1976, Bilandic had been selected by the Chicago City Council to serve as acting mayor for six months until an election would be held. On December 24, Bilandic told alderman and other city hall leaders that he would not be competing in the upcoming special election for the remainder of Daley's term. However, the following week, Bilandic reneged on this pledge, and announced that he would be open to a draft. By 1977, Chicago had not elected a Republican mayor, and had only elected Democratic mayors, for a half-century, with the last Republican elected having been William Hale Thompson in 1927. Dating back to Edward J. Kelly, who took office in 1933, all Chicago mayors up to this point (Kelly, Martin H. Kennelly, Richard J. Daley, and now Bilandic)  had hailed in some sense from Bilandic's 11th Ward.

Primaries and nominations

Democratic primary
Bilandic won the Democratic Party's primary. Bilandic had a well-staged "draft" effort. He won the Cook County Democratic Party central committee's endorsement. Roman Pucinski had entered the race at the point when Bilandic had yet to reverse course on his pledge to not seek election. The party organization had pressured him to drop out of the race for Bilandic's benefit, which he refused to do. Pucinski sought to receive strong support from the city's sizable Polish-American electorage. He also sought to challenge Bilandic to a series of debates, which Bilandic declined. Pucinski was considered Bilandic's foremost opponent in the primary.

Puncinski argued that a Bilandic administration would present more, "politics-as-usual". Pucinski focused much of his campaign on addressing the issue of unemployment. He alleged that Bilandic had been using unfair campaign tactics, alleging that Puncinski campaign workers and supporters had received threats from landlords and city inspectors. Harold Washington's campaign was underfunded and lacked strong organization. He also suffered due to the impact of personal legal issues. He focused his campaign on the black wards of the city's South Side. Washington was an African American, and was counting on receiving strong African American support. Also running was disgraced former Cook County State's Attorney Edward Hanrahan. Minor candidates in the primary were lawyers Anthony R. Martin-Trigona and Ellis E. Reid, the latter of whom was African American.

Wanting to be seen by voters as a competent administrator and chief executive, Bilandic refused to be drawn into controversy and largely ignored his opponents. He sought to also present himself as a friend to business and a successful labor mediator. During the campaign, he made appearances at ribbon-cutting ceremonies, charity dinners, and other events. The Washington Post noted that, largely absent from the discourse of the primary, had been the issues of industries leaving the city, public transport, the quality of schools, and racial integration.

Results
Bilandic won a plurality of the vote in 38 of the city's 50 wards. Pucinski won a plurality of the vote in 7 wards (all on the North and Northwest Sides). Washington won a plurality of the vote in 5 wards. Bilandic had won Southwest Side Polish wards that Pucinski had been counting on winning. After the election results came in, Harold Washington alleged that there had been, "massive vote fraud".

|- bgcolor="#E9E9E9" align="center"
! colspan="5" rowspan="1" align="center" |Chicago Democratic Party Mayoral Primary, 1977
|- bgcolor="#E9E9E9" align="center"
! colspan="2" rowspan="1" align="left" | Candidate
! width="75" | Votes
! width="30" | %
|-
| bgcolor="#3333FF" |
| align="left" | Michael A. Bilandic (incumbent)
|   
| %
|-
| bgcolor="#3333FF" |
| align="left" | Roman Pucinski
|   
| %
|-
| bgcolor="#3333FF" |
| align="left" | Harold Washington
|   
| %
|-
| bgcolor="#3333FF" |
| align="left" | Edward Hanrahan
|   
| %
|-
| bgcolor="#3333FF" |
| align="left" | Anthony Robert Martin-Trigona
|   
| %
|-
| bgcolor="#3333FF" |
| align="left" | Ellis Reid
|   
| %
|-
| colspan="2" align="left" | Total
|  || % 
|-
|}

Republican primary
The Republican nomination was captured by 47th Ward alderman Dennis H. Block, who had originally supported Bilandic before the incumbent mayor reneged on his pledge not to run for a full term. Block was urged by James R. Thompson to run for mayor so as not to hand the office to Democrats.

He handily won the Republican primary over three other Republican candidates. Block, at the time, was the city's sole Republican alderman (among 50). He had been elected an alderman two years prior. Block was the first mayoral candidate since Martin H. Kennelly to be a resident of Edgewater. Thus, he was the first candidate from Edgewater since 1955 and the first general election nominee since 1951 to hail from Edgewater. He was the fourth overall mayoral candidate from the neighborhood, and would have been the third mayor from the neighborhood if elected.

Socialist Workers nomination
Dennis Brasky

U.S. Labor Party nomination
Gerald Rose

General election and result
The general election generated little interest. At 40%, turnout was considered low. Bilandic won a majority of the vote in each of the city's 50 wards.

References

1977
Chicago
1977 Illinois elections
1970s in Chicago
1977 in Illinois
Chicago
Chicago mayoral 1977